Duckman: Private Dick/Family Man is an American adult animated sitcom created by Everett Peck for the USA Network. It follows Eric Tiberius Duckman, a private detective duck, his sidekick Cornfeld, and Duckman's family life as a single father. The series ran from March 5, 1994, to September 6, 1997, for 70 episodes. The series is based on characters created by Peck in a comic book published by Dark Horse Comics in 1990. It was produced in association with Paramount Network Television and animated by Klasky Csupo, who concurrently were also working on Nickelodeon productions such as Aaahh!!! Real Monsters and Rugrats.

Throughout its four-season run, Duckman was met with critical acclaim. IGN ranked Duckman as 48th in its 2009 list of "Top 100 Best Animated TV Shows". The episodes "T.V. or Not to Be", "Noir Gang", and "Duckman and Cornfed in 'Haunted Society Plumbers'" were nominated for a Primetime Emmy Award for Outstanding Animated Program in 1994, 1996, and 1997, respectively.

Series overview

Episodes

Season 1 (1994)

Season 2 (1995)

Season 3 (1996)

Season 4 (1997)

Notes

References

External links
 
 

Lists of American adult animated television series episodes
Lists of American sitcom episodes
Episodes